Dolenz is a surname. Notable people with the surname include:

People 
 George Dolenz (1908–1963), Italian-born American film actor
 Janelle Dolenz, born Janelle Johnson, (1923-1995), American film actress, wife of George
 Micky Dolenz (born 1945), son of George and Janelle, American actor, musician, and television and theater director
 Samantha Dolenz, born Samantha Juste, (1944-2014), wife of Micky, British model and television presenter
 Ami Dolenz (born 1969), daughter of Micky and Samantha, American actress

Characters 
 Kevin Dolenz, a character in St. Elmo's Fire

See also 
 Dolen (disambiguation)
 Dollens